Sillano Giuncugnano is a comune (municipality) in the Province of Lucca in the Italian region of Tuscany. It was created on 1 January 2015 from the merger of Sillano and Giuncugnano.

References